Doomed may refer to:

"Doomed" (Buffy the Vampire Slayer), an episode of the television series Buffy the Vampire Slayer
"Doomed" (Fantastic Four episode), an episode of the television series The Fantastic Four
Doomed (novel), a 2013 novel by Chuck Palahniuk
"Doomed" (Bring Me the Horizon song), 2015
"Doomed" (Moses Sumney song), 2017
DoomEd, an editor for the video game Doom
 Doomed, a 1975 performance art piece by Chris Burden
The Doomed (film), a 1924 German silent drama film
"The Doomed", a 2017 song by A Perfect Circle

See also
Doom (disambiguation)